Kelly Hrudey (born January 13, 1961) is a Canadian former National Hockey League ice hockey goaltender. He is a current hockey broadcaster with Sportsnet as an analyst for Hockey Night in Canada and the Calgary Flames as a commentator. During his NHL career, Hrudey played for the New York Islanders (1983–1989), Los Angeles Kings (1989–1996), and San Jose Sharks (1996–1998).

Biography

Playing career
Hrudey played junior hockey for three years with the Western Hockey League Medicine Hat Tigers. He was drafted in the second round (38th overall) of the 1980 NHL Entry Draft by the New York Islanders. Hrudey first played for the Indianapolis Checkers, New York's minor league affiliate, and moved to the main club in the 1984–85 season.

He was the Islanders' goaltender in 1987 when they defeated the Washington Capitals in the longest game in club history, a four-overtime Game 7 thriller known as the "Easter Epic", which was won on a goal by Pat LaFontaine after 68:47 of overtime. Hrudey made 73 saves in a 3–2 Islander victory that ended just before 2am on Easter morning. Hrudey’s 73 saves in a single game stood as a modern NHL record until Joonas Korpisalo’s 85-save performance for the Columbus Blue Jackets against the Tampa Bay Lightning 33 years later.

Later in 1987, he was the third string goaltender on Team Canada during the 1987 Canada Cup, but did not appear in a game.

In 1989, he was traded to the Los Angeles Kings and would play there for eight seasons. Since his number #30 was retired by the Kings in honor of Rogie Vachon, Hrudey would switch to number #32 which he would wear for the rest of his career. His most notable achievement was playing in the 1993 Stanley Cup finals, but the team lost to Patrick Roy's Montreal Canadiens. In 1996, he signed with the San Jose Sharks and played his last two seasons there before retiring in 1998.

Broadcasting career
During the latter years of his playing career, he often joined Hockey Night in Canada as a studio analyst to supplement their playoff coverage if his team missed or was eliminated from Stanley Cup contention. After retiring, he joined the show full-time as a studio analyst when not washing cars and flipping burgers. He was featured in the "Behind the Mask" segment with hosts Scott Russell and later Scott Oake during the first intermission of the second game of Saturday night doubleheaders. In 2007, Hrudey helped debut Hockey Night in Canada Radio. The show originating from Toronto with host Jeff Marek is a three-hour program dedicated to hockey. The show is broadcast on Sirius XM Channel 122 and 97. Hrudey co-hosts Monday and Wednesday from his home studio in Calgary. For the 2008–09 season, he began working alongside host Ron MacLean and Elliotte Friedman on HNIC'''s lead studio team.

Hrudey also made a weekly appearance on the TSN 1040 in Vancouver with Rick Ball.

With Rogers Media, the parent company of Sportsnet, gaining the sole national rights to the NHL beginning in the 2014-15 season, in August 2014, Hrudey joined Sportsnet full time to participate in their hockey coverage.  In addition to his HNIC'' role (which remains on CBC as part of a four year sub-licensing deal), he along with Ball became the new announcers for the Calgary Flames regional broadcasts.

Personal life
Hrudey lives with his wife Donna and their three daughters in Signal Hill, Calgary, Alberta. Hrudey does advocacy work in the field of mental health, inspired in part by his daughter's struggles with anxiety and obsessive-compulsive disorder.  He received an honorary degree from Mount Royal University on November 3, 2017 for his mental health advocacy efforts. He is of Ukrainian origin. He has a dog named Kingston.

Career statistics

Regular season and playoffs

International

Awards
 WHL Second All-Star Team – 1981

References

External links
stats from hockeydb.com
Bio from hockeygoalies.org
Hrudey's commentator profile on CBC.ca

1961 births
Living people
Canadian colour commentators 
Canadian ice hockey goaltenders
Canadian television sportscasters
Ice hockey people from Edmonton
Indianapolis Checkers (CHL) players
Canadian people of Ukrainian descent
Los Angeles Kings players
Medicine Hat Tigers players
National Hockey League broadcasters
New York Islanders draft picks
New York Islanders players
Phoenix Roadrunners (IHL) players
San Jose Sharks players